Jack Parr (March 13, 1936 – January 4, 2015) was an American professional basketball player.  Parr was born in Louisville, Kentucky.  He played college basketball at Kansas State University.  Kansas State retired his jersey, and his number 33 is hanging from the rafters.  He was drafted by the Cincinnati Royals in the 10th round of the 1958 NBA draft.  He played 66 games for the Royals in 1958–1959, averaging 4.0 points per game.

Jack Parr was not what you would call a picture player early in his career, but he was endowed with an intensity and inner drive that spearheaded him to All-America stature. Rugged and strong, he would sweep the boards. Parr's assortment of shots included a hook and a soft "face the basket" jumper. Against Kansas in Lawrence in 1958, Parr made perhaps his greatest defensive play. With the final seconds ticking away, Kansas went to Wilt Chamberlain under the basket for an assumed easy lay-in. Parr went straight up and batted the ball away, enabling K-State to take a thrilling 79–75 victory.

Three times Parr gained all-league honors. Twice he helped the Wildcats to conference championships and NCAA play and twice received All-America recognition. He still holds KSU's single-season rebounding record and is second on the career charts. He ranks 10th among the all-time Wildcat scoring leaders with 1,184 points. Parr played one season professionally with the Cincinnati Royals before turning to private business and becoming a Big Eight basketball official. He died in January 2015, aged 78, at his home in Lindsborg, Kansas.

References

1936 births
2015 deaths
All-American college men's basketball players
American men's basketball players
Basketball players from Louisville, Kentucky
Centers (basketball)
Cincinnati Royals draft picks
Cincinnati Royals players
Kansas State Wildcats men's basketball players
People from Lindsborg, Kansas